Saint Hugh may refer to:
 Áed mac Bricc, "Saint Hugh of Rahugh"
 Hugh of Rouen (died 730), archbishop of Rouen and bishop of Paris and Bayeux
 Hugh of Cluny (1024–1109), influential eleventh-century monastic
 Hugh of Grenoble (Hugh of Châteauneuf) (1052–1132), bishop of Grenoble
 Hugh of Lincoln (1135/1140–1200), bishop of Lincoln
 Little Saint Hugh of Lincoln, boy murdered in 1255
 Hugh dei Lippi Uggucioni (d. 1282), one of the Seven Founders of the Servite Order